3pol Trobol: Huli Ka Balbon! is a Philippine action-comedy-romance film directed by and starring Coco Martin under his real name Rodel Nacianceno, alongside Jennylyn Mercado and Ai-Ai delas Alas.

Plot
Secretary Ernesto Guillermo (Rowell Santiago), the Executive Director of National Defense Agency was murdered and his aide de camp, Apollo "Pol" Balbon (Coco Martin), is blamed for his death by Senator Simon Esguerra (Edu Manzano) and General Damian Calupitan (Tirso Cruz III). Balbon attempts to contact the executive director's daughter Trina (Jennylyn Mercado) to learn about her father's unfinished mission prior to his death. He dresses in drag, as Pauleen Olivia Margaret or Paloma, to take gain her trust. Balbon and Trina escape to Balate, Batangas, where they stay at a home where Pol's other relatives and friends live. While working at the stable own by Yorme (Isko Moreno) who was the former mayor of Balate, Trina was almost raped by the workers and Balbon saves her and they inform him that they are hiding from Senator Simon Esguerra and General Calupitan. Trina later calls Yaya Mi (Mitch Valdes) to get the Ledger on her room, where her father hid it. After finding the Ledger, she goes to Balate, not knowing one of the Senator Esguerra's men are following her and Andrew Esguerra (Sam Milby) Trina's childhood friend informs his father where Pol and Trina is and he and his wife ordered him to get the Ledger and also kill Balbon and Trina. Meanwhile Yaya Mi finds Balbon and Trina and hands them the Ledger and one of Balbon's relative that Yorme could help them to hand the Ledger to the President. They go to Yorme's house and shows him the Ledger that Senator Esguerra and General Calupitan are responsible for Secretary Guillermo's death and they have to give it to the President and Trina informs that she and Balbon are being man-hunted by Senator Esguerra and General Calupitan and they already taken control of the police. Luckily Yorme reveals himself as an old friend to the President and he will be the one to hand the Ledger to him. Shortly after Yorme left to Manila with the Ledger in tow, Andrew and his men arrive at Balbon's house and captures Trina and one of the Balbon's relatives dashes to Yorme's stable and informs Balbon that Trina has been caught by Andrew's men and he hops on a horse and chases them where it ends at the river which all of Andrew's men are wiped out. Andrew manages to gain the upper hand and almost killed Trina. However before he could do so, Balbon throws a bamboo spear at Andrew killing him and saving Trina. Meanwhile Senator Esguerra and General Calupitan are finally arrested by the President, while the fate of Senator Esguerra's wife is unknown, either, she was also arrested for her indirect involvement. With Senator Esguerra and General Calupitan behind bars and Andrew dead, Balbon and Trina are finally married.

Cast

Main cast
Coco Martin as Apollo "Pol" C. Balbon/Paulene Olivia "Paloma" Margaret -Guillermo
Ai-Ai delas Alas as Mary Balbon
Jennylyn Mercado as Trina Guillermo-Balbon

Supporting cast
Rowell Santiago as Sec. Ernesto Guillermo
Edu Manzano as Sen. Simon Esguerra
Sam Milby as Andrew Esguerra
Tirso Cruz III as Gen. Damian Calupitan 
Isko Moreno as Yorme
John Prats as Junior Calvo
Pepe Herrera as Tolits
Long Mejia as Bisoy
Joey Marquez as Joseph Pahak
Mark Lapid as Noel Pahak
PJ Endrinal as Leonardo Pahak
Lou Veloso as Ka Tinio
Jhong Hilario as Rigor
Ping Medina as Joaquin
Mitch Valdes as Minerva "Yaya Mi" Dimasupil
Liza Lorena as Lola Risa Balbon 
Super Tekla as Boy Balbon/Girlie
Boobsie Wonderland as Baby Balbon-Calvo
Sancho delas Alas as Melchor
Joven Olvido as Gaspar
Nonong Ballinan as Baltazar
Donna Cariaga as Gloria

Guest cast
Carmi Martin as Cristy Esguerra
Jojit Lorenzo as Rudolph "Dong" Calvo
Bianca Manalo as Luningning Calvo
Marc Solis as Huey
Lester Llansang as Dewey
John Medina as Louie
Lordivino "Bassilyo" Ignacio as Raphael
Bryan "Smugglaz" Lao as Michelangelo
Anghel "Happy" Marcial as Donatello
Soliman Cruz as General Garcia
Kim Molina as Vilma
Marissa Delgado as Lola Nida
Whitney Tyson as Sharon
Bernard Palanca as Eric
Ali Khatibi as Jomari
Paolo Paraiso as Mark
Ivana Alawi as Stacey
Al Vaughn Chier Tuliao as Hansel
Iyannah Joyce Sumalpong as Gretel
Maynard Lapid as Gen. Eugenio
Most of the cast members are Martin's colleagues in the action television series Ang Probinsyano.

Production
3pol Trobol: Huli Ka Balbon! was directed by Coco Martin under his own production outfit CCM Productions. Also as one of the co-stars and a producer of the film, Martin's role as director is credited under his real name Rodel Nacianceno.  Noreen Capili was the screenwriter3pol Trobol was produced as an "action-comedy-romance film".

Release
3pol Trobol premiered in cinemas across the Philippines on December 25, 2019, as one of the eight official entries to the 2019 Metro Manila Film Festival.

Reception

Critical reception
Jocelyn Valle of PEP.ph remarked that 3pol Trobol "became a more acceptable film to watch" compared to Martin's previous entry, but noted its formulaic production and premise derived from FPJ's Ang Probinsyano. Both Oggs Cruz of Rappler and Neil Charm of BusinessWorld each gave the film a more critical review, however: Oggs Cruz found Martin's portrayal of the Paloma alter ego, wherein Martin's character uses the Paloma persona to discreetly watch a woman change her clothes or "steal a kiss", "distasteful", and Jennylyn Mercado's character being depicted as a stereotypical damsel in distress "outdated". Neil Charm was also similarly perturbed at the film; while he praised it as an improvement over Martin's previous films, he found the subplot of Pol and his cohorts' perversion, along with scenes of attempted rape "disturbing", hoping "one day Mr. Nacianceno moves on from dirty jokes and using sexual harassment as a trope in his action films." Charm also lamented what he saw as early campaigning on part of Isko Moreno.

References

External links 
 

2019 action comedy films
Philippine action comedy films
2019 romantic comedy films
Philippine romantic comedy films
LGBT-related comedy films
2019 films
2019 LGBT-related films